George Primrose may refer to:

 George H. Primrose (1852–1919), minstrel performer, one half of the comedy duo Primrose and West
 George Anson Primrose (1849–1930), British naval officer